Goran Tošić (born October 7, 1982) is a retired professional tennis player who formerly represented Montenegro and most recently Serbia.

ATP Challenger & ITF Futures

Singles Titles (8)

References

External links
 
 
 

Montenegrin male tennis players
Serbian male tennis players 
Living people
1982 births
Sportspeople from Pančevo
Mediterranean Games silver medalists for Montenegro
Competitors at the 2009 Mediterranean Games
Mediterranean Games medalists in tennis